Syd Barrett (1946–2006) was an English musician who was best known as the original frontman and primary songwriter of the English rock band Pink Floyd. With the band, he recorded and wrote the majority of songs for their first album The Piper at the Gates of Dawn, and was credited for one song ("Jugband Blues") on their second album A Saucerful of Secrets. To this day, his Pink Floyd songs are used frequently on the band's various compilations.

After he left Pink Floyd, he recorded two solo albums, The Madcap Laughs and Barrett. Both albums, released in 1970, were re-released as a double album in 1974, after the unexpected success of Pink Floyd's The Dark Side of the Moon. On 24 February 1970, he recorded five songs (one from The Madcap Laughs, three from Barrett, and a one-off, "Two of a Kind") for the BBC Radio show Top Gear. These songs were released as a mini-album, in 1987, as Syd Barrett: The Peel Session. In 2004, the five songs from Top Gear, and three songs from a then-newly discovered tape of Bob Harris show, were released as The Radio One Sessions.

Solo career

Albums

Studio

Live

Compilations

Singles

Appearances
 Joy of a Toy by Kevin Ayers (November 1969): plays guitar on "Religious Experience" ("Singing a Song in the Morning") – bonus track on remastered 2003 CD.

See also
Pink Floyd discography
List of songs recorded by Syd Barrett

References

Biblobiography

 

Discography
Barrett, Syd